Half Way Battery was an artillery battery in the British Overseas Territory of Gibraltar. The battery was on the coast on the eastern side of the isthmus just north of Europa Point Lighthouse. In 1859 there were two guns.

References

Batteries in Gibraltar